Hungerbach may refer to:

Hungerbach (Altmühl), a river of Bavaria, Germany, tributary of the Altmühl
Hungerbach (Gennach), a river of Bavaria, Germany, tributary of the Gennach